Mabel Berra was a vaudeville star in the early twentieth century who became known as the "Venus of Vaudeville." At the height of her popularity, she earned $850 a week, the approximate equivalent of $20,000 a week in 2014.

Personal life
Although her origins are not clearly documented, Mabel Berra is believed to have been born near Loudonville, Ohio in 1886. Berra was one of the early twentieth century's best entertainers. She was a comic and opera singer who performed many shows on Broadway as part of the Keith Theatre Company. Berra's vaudeville act became extremely popular when she was still in her teens. She studied grand opera in five different languages. Later in life, she married Charles Allen.

Tours

North America
Berra debuted in Toledo when she was sixteen years old. Her meteoric rise to fame led to a full North American tour. By the time that she was twenty-two, she was receiving great reviews and performing on extended tours in Europe.

Europe
While touring in Europe, Berra performed for huge crowds, some of which included royalty. She was so well loved that she had to plan for a dozen encores in every show. Although she had many offers to stay in Europe for extensive periods of time, she ultimately had to cancel her third tour and return home to the United States due to the outbreak of World War I.

Shows
Berra's most popular shows were:
 Eternal Waltz
 The Enchantress
 Little Nemo

Death
On the afternoon of Saturday, December 28, 1928, Mabel Berra was walking her dog on Park Avenue in New York City when the dog broke loose and ran into the street. While trying to retrieve her dog from the road, Berra was struck by a car and died.

References

External links
 Cleo Redd Fisher Historical Museum

1880s births
1928 deaths
American actresses